Mweka is a territory in Kasai province of the Democratic Republic of the Congo.

Territories of Kasaï Province
Democratic Republic of Congo geography articles needing translation from French Wikipedia